Britain's Next Top Model, Cycle 5 is the fifth cycle of Britain's Next Top Model and the fifth cycle to air on Living. With an increased budget, Cycle 5 claims to be "bigger, better and more high-fashion than ever before."

The winner of this cycle, like the previous cycles (excluding Cycle 1), received a contract with modelling agency Models 1, became the face of a Max Factor cosmetics campaign, and a cover and six-page spread in Company Magazine. This was Lisa Snowdon's last series as the host before she was replaced by model Elle Macpherson.

Mecia Simson was the winner of the competition. 

Runner-up Sophie Sumner along with fellow contestants Annaliese Dayes and Ashley Brown also participated as contestants on America's Next Top Model: British Invasion along with four other former BNTM contestants. While Brown and Dayes were eliminated in the 5th and 11th episodes respectively, Sumner would later claim victory as the winner of ANTM Cycle 18.

Production
This cycle saw major changes in the show. While Lisa Snowdon and Huggy Ragnarsson both returned to the judging panel, head garment designer and distinguished milliner, Louis Mariette, took over from Gerry DeVeaux. This series was also the first to feature a boot-camp stage, with 20 semi-finalists starting the competition in the cycle premiere, the largest number of girls that the show has started with so far. 7 girls were eliminated in the first episode, and the number of finalists was reduced to the final 13 who entered the Britain's Next Top Model house, in London.

This is the second cycle (after cycle 1) with two international destinations. In episode 6, the final 9 contestants travelled to Reykjavík, and in episode 9, the final 5 contestants travelled to Buenos Aires.

Contestants
(ages stated are at start of contest)

Episodes

The Girls Go To Boot Camp 
Original airdate: 20 April 2009

The 20 potential contestants arrive at a country manor house with a champagne reception, and are soon greeted by host Lisa, who informs them they are to enter the gruelling model boot camp. Amongst the girls is Hayley, who was chosen by the public to take part following an online vote. After completing an assault course at Henfold Lakes Dorking, now home to the famous 'Nuts Challenge' (probably the longest army assault course in the world) the girls did a catwalk challenge featuring clothing from the Ed Hardy range, as well as a brief individual meeting with the judges, 5 girls are eliminated when they don't find dog tags in boxes placed on their beds.

Eliminated: Emily Holmes, Emma Ward, Jennifer Thomas-Grant, Natalie Henry & Natasha Causon

The episode's photo challenge sees the remaining 15 girls put in the following three groups of five for an army inspired shoot with Huggy:

At panel, the judges have praise for Mecia, Viola, Hayley, Jade, Chloe and Kasey, who all stand out in their pictures, as well as Lauren, who is rather bizarrely told by new judge Louis that she is 'the new Moulin Rouge'.

Daisy is told she looks dead in the eyes, while Ashley disappoints when she states she is not happy with the way she has photographed. Mecia receives the first call out and is thrilled to be told she has booked a billboard campaign in the USA for Christian Audigier, after impressing on the catwalk. Ultimately, 2 more girls are eliminated; Nell because of some wrist worry from the judge and her look not being versatile, and Rebecca over concern of her commitment to the competition. The 13 girls are finally ready to enter the Top Model house.

First Call-Out: Mecia Simson
Bottom Three: Ashley Brown, Nell Naberro & Rebecca Ball
Eliminated: Nell Naberro & Rebecca Ball
Featured photographer: Huggy Ragnarsson

Quizzes and Castings
Original airdate: 27 April 2009

The girls excitedly move into the model house and are thrilled with their new abode.  The following morning they are split into two teams for a very raucous fashion quiz, with the winners (Ashley, Daisy, Jade, Kasey, Lisa-Ann & Sophie) receiving designer watches.  The week's challenge is to film an advert on the Millennium bridge wearing Elizabeth Emanuel bridal wear. The girls have to deliver some dialogue then kiss a male model. Kasey impresses and wins the challenge, while Mecia irritates the photographer by refusing to kiss the model, worried she will upset her boyfriend of four years.

The girls return home to find high heels all over the living room and are delighted when J. Alexander (Miss J) appears from behind a curtain and informs the 'model bitches' it's time for them to learn how to walk.  Daisy and Hayley prove to be amongst the strongest, while Lisa-Ann and Chloe's efforts are heavily derided and amusingly imitated by Miss J.

The week's photo shoot challenge asks the girls to pose naked in a bath of water filled with mangos for the brand Simple Cosmetics. Sophie struggles, going into 'panic mode' once in the water, while Ashley is concerned how her body will look considering she has had two children.

At elimination, the judges have praise for Daisy, Hayley, Mecia and Kasey, while Chloe is told her picture looks like soft porn. Mecia is also reprimanded for her performance at the week's challenge. Ultimately, Sophie and Lisa-Ann wind up in the bottom two; Sophie because of her poor performance at the photo-shoot and Lisa-Ann due to having a generally dismal week. Lisa-Ann is the first girl to be sent home from the model house.

First call-out: Kasey Wynter
Bottom two: Lisa-Ann Hillman & Sophie Sumner
Eliminated: Lisa-Ann Hillman
Featured photographer: Christopher Bissell (credited as Chris Bissell)
Special guests: Simon Withington, Elizabeth Emanuel, J. Alexander, Lloyd Nwagboso, Rachel Snary

Re-style and Rhythm
Original airdate: 4 May 2009

Tensions rise in the model house when Annaliese tells the other girls to turn off the kitchen's extractor fan as she can smell mackerel and tuna in her bedroom at the other side of the house. Chloe answers back, accusing Annaliese of not washing her scrambled eggs pan with washing up liquid, which results in Annaliese angrily branding Chloe a wannabe porn star and lads mag model.

The following day the girls arrive at Daniel Galvin salon to excitedly receive their long-awaited makeovers. Madeleine is very upset with her short, asymmetric ginger bob, and thinks she looks like a boy or "even a lesbian". Sophie and Ashley are also less than pleased with their short, edgier haircuts, although Kasey takes the removal of her blonde weave in her stride and seems happy with her short black bob. It is Viola, however, who impresses the salon's management the most, and she is chosen to model for their 50th anniversary ad campaign.

The week's challenge involves the girls performing a dance routine in groups of four at London's Movida nightclub. Mecia and Annaliese impress and they along with the winning group of four (Ashley, Daisy, Hayley, & Kasey) get to party the night away at the club, while the losers return home. At the week's photo shoot, the girls are taken to an underground carpark and are shocked when they're told they are to be paired up and will be kissing their partner in the following pairs:

Sophie is disgusted that she will have to kiss Mecia, who has been sick the night before from drinking too much. Hayley, Daisy and Lauren perform confidently, while Chloe & Ashley struggles to feel comfortable on set.

At panel, the judges have praise for Daisy, Hayley, Jade, Lauren, Viola, Mecia & Kasey. Madeleine is reprimanded for her attitude at the makeovers, though she redeems herself in her photo, but it is Ashley and Chloe who land in the bottom two for their weak performance at the photo shoot, with Chloe being told by photographer Nicky Johnston that her becoming a model is about as likely as him studying medicine at Harvard. In a shocking twist, Lisa announces that both girls are to be given another chance and no-one is eliminated.

 First call-out: Kasey Wynter
 Bottom two: Ashley Brown & Chloe Cummings
 Eliminated: None
 Featured photographer: Nicky Johnston
 Special guests: James Galvin, Louise Galvin, Jaime Karitzis, Daniele Sismondi, Alex Evans (uncredited), Leanne Nagle (uncredited), Rachael Cairns (uncredited)

Charity
Original airdate: 11 May 2009

Returning home from judging panel, many of the girls, particularly Sophie and Daisy, are angry that nobody was eliminated. Chloe in particular is targeted, with some girls questioning her place in the competition.

The following morning the girls are excited to meet 'rock royalty', Jo Wood, who challenges them to perform a short inspirational speech in front of a group of 12- to 16-year-olds. Jade impresses, talking candidly about her battle with anorexia, while Chloe particularly disappoints with her talk on her passion, make up. She also gets in trouble for lecturing against animal cruelty whilst wearing a leather jacket. Surprisingly to some of the other girls, Daisy wins the challenge.

The next day the girls meet Johnny Vaughan at Capital FM, who interviews the girls in groups of three, with Lisa watching behind the scenes. Viola performs particularly badly, not saying one word throughout, while Annaliese impresses and wins the challenge, choosing to take Ashley on a shopping spree for the prize.

The week's photo challenge involves the girls posing for adverts highlighting issues raised by various different charities and campaigns as follows:

At panel the judges told that Sophie's close-up is a mess, but the wide is insane. Both Jade and Daisy continues to impress, but Ashley produced the most believable photo, of which she has been a victim of domestic violence in the past. Both Viola and Madeleine impressed for their QUIT campaign, Chloe receives praise for her huge improvement from last week, Mecia's photograph is well received but she is told that her film was poor. The rest of the girls receive much more negative reviews. Ultimately, Lauren and Kasey wind up in the bottom two, and Lauren is sent home because of her limited look and the lack of variety in her facial expressions.

 First call-out: Sophie Sumner
 Bottom two: Kasey Wynter & Lauren Wee
 Eliminated: Lauren Wee
 Featured photographer: Matthew Brindle
 Special guests: Johnny Vaughan, Jo Wood, Leah Wood (in video message), Lina El-Solh (Know Your Limits rep), Robbie LeBlanc (PETA Europe rep), Claire Everett (Frank rep), Alison Walsh (Quit rep)

Kylie Couture
Original airdate: 18 May 2009

The girls are taken to a London club where they are introduced to Louise Redknapp.  In turn, the girls interview Louise, with the girl that impresses the most having her interview featured on Handbag.com.  Sophie and Chloe are reprimanded for asking inappropriate and negative questions, but Hayley impresses and is delighted to be chosen by Louise as the winner.

The week's second reward challenge sees the girls modelling hats and headwear by judge Louis, and having to walk elegantly to impress a party of people, including Fashion Director, Hilary Alexander, who asks each girl probing questions.  Again, Chloe disappoints, tripping on some rose petals on the floor, but Louis is pleased with the performances by Hayley, Daisy and especially Jade, who wins the challenge and a specially made head piece designed by Louis.

Back at the house, the girls are excited to receive a video message from Kylie Minogue, who explains that this week's photo-shoot will be for her new perfume, 'Couture', and the girls will be wearing elegant evening dresses harking back to 1920s glamour.  At the photo-shoot, Jade, Daisy and Mecia impress, while Kasey and Chloe struggle to relax on set.

At panel, the judges have praise for Jade, who receives the first call out, as well as Daisy and Mecia.  Ultimately, both for the second time, Kasey and Chloe wind up in the bottom two, for producing lacklustre photos. Despite Kasey receiving two consecutive first call-outs in the first two weeks, the girls are shocked when Lisa reveals that both girls in the bottom two are eliminated from the competition due to not pushing through and delivering strong pictures.

First call-out: Jade McSorley
Bottom two/Eliminated: Chloe Cummings & Kasey Wynter
Featured photographer: Johnny Blue-Eyes
Special guests: Belinda White, Louise Redknapp, Hilary Alexander, Kylie Minogue (in 2 video messages), Rachel Hardy, Giles Pearson

Ice Queens
Original airdate: 25 May 2009

The girls are excited to learn they are to go on a surprise overseas trip where they are to take part in a photo shoot in the freezing cold. The following day, judge and photographer Huggy Ragnarsson meets them at London Heathrow Airport and reveals they're going to Iceland. At dinner in their new destination, some of the girls question what they're eating - a harbinger of the challenge they will face the next day.

The challenge is to shoot a commercial to market Iceland. Andrea Brabin, who runs a casting agency, tells the girls they are to wear Icelandic clothes, eat Icelandic food and recite a line in the local language, while shooting the commercial. The sheep's head horrifies the girls and some girls have trouble eating the delicacy, including Jade who does not eat the meat because of her vegetarianism. Some excel in the commercial however, especially Sophie, who is the eventual winner of the challenge.

The girls' photo shoot the next day is on the rocky shoreline of the Blue Lagoon, with each girl representing a different queen. Most girls do a good job, based on feedback by Huggy who is the week's photographer, but Viola is lightly reprimanded for her inability to keep still.

Before the girls are due to leave Iceland, Viola and Ashley end up fighting back at the hotel, with Ashley accusing Viola of having no manners, which leaves Viola angry and in tears.

Back in the UK and straight at panel, Daisy is given the opportunity to be a guest judge on the panel due to the fact that she excelled at the photo shoot, making her exempt from elimination. Viola is told by Huggy and Lisa that her picture is strong, but Louis disagrees, thinking she looks boring and flat. Jade's picture, however, is unanimously praised, and she is told that she is growing in confidence and definitely progressing. Mecia, Hayley and Ashley also received huge praise for their beautiful photo's, while the judges thought Sophie's photograph is good but not great.

Ultimately, Annaliese and Madeleine end up in the bottom two. Annaliese is told that her energy and enthusiasm is causing her to lose focus while the judges see Madeleine as having an ideal face for beauty but she is missing height and edge. In the end, Madeleine is sent home due to her lack of editorial appeal.

Immune / First call-out: Daisy Payne
Bottom two: Annaliese Dayes & Madeleine Wheatley
Eliminated: Madeleine Wheatley
Featured photographer: Huggy Ragnarsson
Special guests: Andrea Brabin

Sink or Swim
Original airdate: 1 June 2009

The weekly challenge involves the girls all posing for photographs wearing Faith shoes, with the winning two pictures being displayed in shop windows throughout the country.  Despite good performances from Jade and Annaliese, it is Sophie and Ashley who impress the most and win the challenge, and as an extra treat, the girls are taken to a luxury nail salon, where they get the chance to drink champagne and discuss the behaviour of their fellow competitors.

The week's photo-shoot proves to be the most gruelling to date, with each girl posing underwater in a large tank, wearing a Louis Mariette headpiece and a gown designed by Debbie Gething (now Debbie Wingham).  Jade impresses the most, despite being so light that she finds it hard to stay under water, although Hayley and Viola panic and do not perform so confidently.

Back at the house, there is further tension, mainly surrounding Viola's supposed attitude problem. But it is Ashley and Mecia who end up coming to blows, with Mecia accused of being a 'two-faced bitch' with regards to her behaviour around Viola.

At panel, most of the girls produced poor photos, and only Jade, Viola and Ashley shine. Jade received yet another first call-out for her outstanding photo and her facial expression underwater, while Viola is very close behind, as the judges really like how she changes herself underwater so she can look "Long, Lean, and Beautiful". Ashley shocked Lisa when she pulled off a decent photo, but rest of the others failed to impress the judges.

Sophie's pose in her photo received positive reviews, however her facial expression was criticized heavily. Mecia was lambasted for looking dead and drowned in her photo rather than beautiful, while Annaliese's bubbly personality did not show in her photo but ended up looking "afraid of a shark coming". But it was Daisy and Hayley, both of them producing stunning shots the week before but poor photos this week. Daisy's stronger performance keeps her safe while Hayley's inconsistent performance sent her home.

First call-out: Jade McSorley
Bottom two: Daisy Payne & Hayley Buchanan
Eliminated: Hayley Buchanan
Featured photographer: Michele Civelli (challenge), Zena Holloway (photo shoot)
Special guests: Alistair Monteith, Ruth Ross, Debbie Gething

Surprise Casting
Original airdate: 8 June 2009

The seven remaining girls return to the house following Hayley's surprise elimination, and Mecia finds she is the only girl to receive a personal letter from Hayley, upsetting Ashley who felt that, also being Scottish, she should have got one too. The girls learn that they are to attend two separate castings, with the first being for Imodium. Viola struggles, and admits she is unaware what the product is, whilst Sophie is unable to correctly name the product. Ashley is initially confident, but following her meeting, finds that the other girls are shocked at how blunt her description of the product was. Annaliese impresses, and wins a potential role in a television campaign for Imodium, to the amusement of the others.

At the second casting, the girls are excited to meet Pearl Lowe who is looking for another girl to star alongside her daughter, the model Daisy Lowe for her new look-book. Mecia is selected as the best and wins the job. Jade is told that she is too skinny for the campaign, and she breaks down on the way home.

Next the girls head to a wind tunnel, to film a potential commercial for Rice Cakes. Sophie tells Viola that people have died from using a wind tunnel, causing her to perform badly. Daisy is deemed the best, and wins tickets to a private fashion party, choosing to take Sophie with her.

At the party, and just as Sophie is expressing her delight that 'Scouse' was eliminated, Chloe's cousin, and former BNTM runner-up Abigail Clancy arrives, prompting Sophie to worry that Chloe had said bad things about her. Later, Daisy and Sophie lie to the other girls, making up a story that they met a fictional fashion designer, which most of the other girls, and Jade in particular believe.

The girls head to their photo shoot which sees them posing with a burning car for a potential Lipsy campaign. Abigail appears to monitor the girls' performances on set, and Daisy and Sophie are forced to reveal that they had met her the night before, which the others take it in good humour. At panel, Abigail returns as the guest judge for the week, and informs the rest of the panel that Sophie seemed like a know-it-all and acting disgustingly every time.

The girls are generally considered disappointing, including Jade which had been always producing impressive shots the previous weeks. The only girl that had a stunning photo is Viola, as the judges really inspired with how she changed her shy persona into a glamorous woman in the shot, and she also using her whole body as an asset and working them together to produce a powerful photograph with her personality successfully comes through. However, even if her shot isn't close to match Viola's impressive shot (mostly because she totally forgot the car), Mecia was deemed very good on the set (as did Viola's) and the client love her, so she received the first call-out.

The rest of the girls produce a disappointing shots, such as: Jade is criticized for not knowing what she's doing because she didn't either look commercial or editorial, Ashley's pose deemed as decent but she totally forget the car. Daisy's body proportion is praised for looking long and lean, but her facial expression deemed by Huggy as "Driving Miss Daisy in Drag". But the last two girls are the most unimpressive. Sophie ended in the bottom two, despite producing a good photo but Abigail and the client was so disappointed of her because she acted disgustingly and seemed like a know-it-all, with Annaliese, who the judges think was holding back. Sophie is spared, with Annaliese sent home.

First call-out: Mecia Simson
Bottom two: Annaliese Dayes & Sophie Sumner
Eliminated: Annaliese Dayes
Featured photographer: Rachel Joseph
Special guests: Fraser Belk, Abigail Clancy, Caroline Copsey, Julia Anderton, Eira Ellis, Pearl Lowe, Dahlia Schaeffer

Face, Face, Face
Original airdate: 15 June 2009

The girls are immediately thrown into a photo shoot for Company magazine, the magazine that is going to put the winner on the cover. The twist is that the photo shoot is with the upcoming rock band The Script. This causes a few of the girls to get star struck and impacts negatively on their photo. Sophie wins the challenge and chooses Daisy to come with her to The Script's gig later that evening, with both girls enjoying champagne backstage with the band afterwards. Back at the house, tension brews when Ashley accuses Sophie of breaking a promise that they had made previously, where Sophie would take Ashley on a reward in exchange for tips on photo shoots.

The second challenge of the week is a commercial for Special K. Lisa, having done several commercials for the company, tells the girls now is the time to step up. She's especially concerned about Viola and even gives her a special pep talk with regards to her attitude. Jade also gets some one-to-one time with Lisa because of her weight, and she talks candidly about her battle with anorexia. Despite this extra attention, Sophie takes home the prize for the second time this episode, which was a video message from loved ones from home.

The photo shoot is a recreation of the famous Kate Moss lace body suit beauty shot. Terry O'Neill, who photographed the original, is not particularly impressed with anybody's performance on set, with the exception of Mecia and especially Jade, who he thinks might have something special.

After the shoot, Lisa shows off her skills from Strictly Come Dancing with her professional dance partner from the show, Brendan Cole. The dancing isn't completely irrelevant, as Lisa uses it to reveal that the girls (with the exception of one) are headed to Buenos Aires.

At panel, Terry has criticism for all the girls except Jade, with some judges expressing that they prefer Jade's picture to Kate Moss'. The judges also love Viola's shot, while Mecia is told she would work better as an actress. Terry tells Sophie that he doesn't 'get her look' at all. Ashley shocks the judges by admitting that she had attended the photo shoot hungover. Ashley winds up in the bottom two due to her lack of professionalism and Daisy is placed in the bottom two for producing lackluster photos, and it is early favourite Daisy and her 'wonky' eye who is shockingly sent home due to her lack of vitality and for looking older than she is, whilst the other girls get ready to head to Argentina.

First call-out: Jade McSorley
Bottom two: Ashley Brown & Daisy Payne
Eliminated: Daisy Payne
Featured photographer: Diana Gomez (Company photo shoot), Terry O'Neill (Kate Moss photo shoot)
Special guests: Sarah Cumming, Brendan Cole, The Script, Victoria White

Time to Tango
Original airdate: 22 June 2009

The girls excitedly arrive in Buenos Aires and are thrilled to be given a tour of the city by a male model, who Viola seems particularly enamoured with. Their first task is to perform a fashion show for the local elite society, modelling polo clothes. Sophie is shocked to be criticised by Lisa for her steely expression and uninviting body language, while Jade is praised for her moves. The fivesome are allowed to enjoy the remainder of the party, which Sophie and Ashley use as an opportunity to flirt with the male guests.

The following day the girls head into the desert to do a casting for a commercial. They have a few lines to deliver including something in Spanish, as well as having to interact with the male models and get on a horse. Mecia struggles slightly with the words, and her Spanish is unintelligible. Jade does a fairly good job, while Ashley forgets her words and giggles too much. Viola is deemed the worst, completely forgetting her words and the director eventually gives up on her. Sophie, however, does an excellent job, and wins yet another challenge. Afterwards, they had to stay at Purmamarca for the night.

Next, the girls head into the famous Argentinian Salt Flats for a photo shoot for a potential nationwide campaign for Skin Bliss. Mecia has quite a good shoot, but lacks diversity of facial expressions, as does Ashley who is visibly nervous. Again, Viola does not let her personality shine through, while Jade and Sophie perform confidently.

At panel, Jade is praised for her photo, as is Sophie, who is thrilled to learn she has won the campaign. Despite producing a good photo, Viola is reprimanded for her unprofessional attitude on set at the commercial casting, and ends up in the bottom two with Ashley, who the judges feel is not taking the competition as seriously as she should. In a very shocking ending to everyone, Viola is sent home because the judges feeling she had seemed to give up, despite having a strong look, very strong portfolio and just had second call-out three weeks in a row and four in total.

First call-out: Sophie Sumner
Bottom two: Ashley Brown & Viola Szekely
Eliminated: Viola Szekely
Featured photographer: Rachel Joseph
Special guests: Ignacio Archain, Ivan Valdivizzo, Caroline Reynolds, Beltran Zuberbuhler

Latino Dancing and Latino Loving
Original airdate: 29 June 2009

The girls are given a crash course in Latin dancing at a traditional Argentinian dance hall, and then an hour later sent to perform a tango on the streets of La Boca. None of the girls fare particularly well, although Ashley's confused performance leaves the most to be desired. Back at the house, Ashley argued with Sophie and feels that she was wanting to get Jade out of the house.

The following day the girls are sent on their first go-sees. The first is with Elite Model Management, who quiz the girls on their eating and exercise habits. Ashley admits that she has a bad diet, while Sophie does not impress when she states that shopping comprises the largest part of her exercise regime. The second go-see is at the boutique of top designer, Benito Fernandez, where each girl enjoys strutting their stuff in his colourful clothes. Next the girls are taken to see haute couture designer Pablo Ramirez, where Louis announces that Jade has impressed the most throughout the day, and she is delighted to be able to choose one of Pablo's dresses to keep.

Back at the house, the girls are joined again by their model tour guide, Ivan, and his equally dashing friend. The evening's drinking games lead to frolics in the pool, resulting in Ashley and Sophie getting amorous with the boys, and Sophie branding Ashley's aggressive goodbye kiss with her man as bordering on soft porn.

The next day's photo-shoot is for the very high fashion Catalogue magazine, with each girl having to pose seductively with a male model while dressed in regal attire. Sophie sets the bar high with an impressive performance on set, while Jade also shines, delivering some sexy poses, which leaves Sophie questioning whether Jade is as nice and innocent as she seems.

At panel, Jade received another first call-out, thus making her tie with Cycle 3's runner up Louise Watts for the most collective first call-out in a season for the model. However, Mecia and a very nervous Ashley in the bottom two. Mecia is criticised for not interacting effectively with the boy model and an uninspiring performance on set as well as not delivering a variety of facial expressions, but at least has produced a lucky shot, while it is agreed that Ashley looks stiff in her photo and might have given too little too late. Unfortunately, it is Ashley that is sent back to the UK.

 First call-out: Jade McSorley
 Bottom two: Ashley Brown & Mecia Simson
 Eliminated: Ashley Brown
 Featured photographer: Candelaria Gil
 Special guests: Benito Fernandez, Pablo Ramirez, Jimena Nahon, Ivan Valdivizzo, Ginette Reynal, Belén Vińas

The Finale is Coming
Original airdate: 6 July 2009

The three remaining girls arrive in Buenos Aires for the Fashion Week. They have to work backstage. Later, they are challenged to re-enact scenes from the life of Argentinian icon Eva Perón for a photo shoot, in two different shots each (a full length shot and beauty shot). During elimination, it is Jade who is sent home. Afterwards, Sophie and Mecia are whisked back to London in preparation for the final catwalk showdown.

 Final three: Jade McSorley, Mecia Simson & Sophie Sumner
 Eliminated: Jade McSorley
 Featured photographer: Huggy Ragnarsson

Finale
Original airdate: 6 July 2009 

The pressure mounts as the remaining two competitors face the glare of the press and the glamour of the modeling high-life before their final showdown. All of the eliminated models (including Hayley, Madeleine & Daisy) come back to support them, as did the finalists families. Mecia was crowned Britain's Next Top Model for 2009.

 Final two: Mecia Simson & Sophie Sumner
 Britain's Next Top Model: Mecia Simson
 Special guests: Fraser Belk, Rosie Huntington-Whiteley, Peaches Geldof, Sara Nathan, Jodie Kidd, Abigail Clancy, Lee Lapthorne, Percy Parker, Amy Molyneux
Note: This episode aired at 10pm due to the launch of Four Weddings

Summaries

Call-out order

 The contestant was eliminated
 The contestant was part of a non-elimination bottom two
 The contestant was immune from elimination
 The contestant won the competition

 In episode 1, the pool of 20 girls was reduced to 13 who moved on to the main competition. There were two separate eliminations; in the first, five girls were eliminated outside of panel, and in the second, two girls were eliminated.

Average  call-out order
Episode 13 is not included.

Bottom two 

 The contestant was eliminated after their first time in the bottom two
 The contestant was eliminated after their second time in the bottom two
 The contestant was eliminated after their fourth time in the bottom two
 The contestant was eliminated in the semi-final judging and placed third
 The contestant was eliminated in the final judging and placed as the runner-up

Photo shoot guide 
 Episode 1 photo shoot: Army bootcamp in groups (casting)
 Episode 2 photo shoot: Naked mango bath for skin campaign
 Episode 3 photo shoot: Rock couture lesbians
 Episode 4 photo shoot: Social awareness campaigns
 Episode 5 photo shoot: Kylie Minogue "Couture" fragrance ad
 Episode 6 photo shoot: 9 Nordic queens of Iceland
 Episode 7 photo shoot: Underwater nymphs
 Episode 8 photo shoot: Glam with a burning car
 Episode 9 photo shoots: Fans of The Script; Kate Moss beauty shot replicas
 Episode 10 photo shoot: Nude with a towel in an Argentinian salt plain for Skin Bliss campaign
 Episode 11 photo shoot: Tango dancers
 Episode 12 photo shoot: Re-enacting Eva Perón

Judges
 Lisa Snowdon
 Huggy Ragnarsson
 Louis Mariette

Ratings
Episode viewing figures from BARB

References

External links
 Britain's Next Top Model 5 Official Site

05
2009 British television seasons
Television shows filmed in England
Television shows filmed in Iceland
Television shows filmed in Argentina